Earlton is a city in Neosho County, Kansas, United States.  As of the 2020 census, the population of the city was 60.

History
Earlton (or Earleton) was founded in 1870. Not much progress in the community was made until about 1876 when a railroad depot was built there.

A post office was opened in Earlton (at first called Earleton) in 1871, and remained in operation until it was discontinued in 1976.

Geography
Earlton is located at  (37.587366, -95.469472), placing it in the south east of Kansas.

Demographics

2010 census
As of the census of 2010, there were 55 people, 23 households, and 17 families residing in the city. The racial makeup of the city was 96.4% White, 1.8% Native American, and 1.8% from two or more races.

There were 23 households, of which 30.4% had children under the age of 18 living with them, 65.2% were married couples living together, 8.7% had a male householder with no wife present, and 26.1% were non-families. 21.7% of all households were made up of individuals, and 17.4% had someone living alone who was 65 years of age or older. The average household size was 2.39 and the average family size was 2.82.

The median age in the city was 46.5 years. 21.8% of residents were under the age of 18; 1.8% were between the ages of 18 and 24; 25.6% were from 25 to 44; 29.2% were from 45 to 64; and 21.8% were 65 years of age or older. The gender makeup of the city was 45.5% male and 54.5% female.

2000 census
As of the census of 2000, there were 80 people, 32 households, and 23 families residing in the city. The racial makeup of the city was 95.00% White and 5.00% Native American.

There were 32 households, out of which 31.3% had children under the age of 18 living with them, 62.5% were married couples living together, 6.3% had a female householder with no husband present, and 28.1% were non-families. 21.9% of all households were made up of individuals, and 12.5% had someone living alone who was 65 years of age or older. The average household size was 2.50 and the average family size was 2.96.

In the city, the population was spread out, with 22.5% under the age of 18, 12.5% from 18 to 24, 26.3% from 25 to 44, 20.0% from 45 to 64, and 18.8% who were 65 years of age or older. The median age was 36 years. For every 100 females, there were 90.5 males. For every 100 females age 18 and over, there were 100.0 males.

The median income for a household in the city was $46,250, and the median income for a family was $70,625. Males had a median income of $27,083 versus $28,750 for females. The per capita income for the city was $19,421. There were no families and 7.0% of the population living below the poverty line, including no under eighteens and none of those over 64.

Education
The community is served by Chanute USD 413 public school district.

References

External links
 Earlton - Directory of Public Officials
 Earlton city map, KDOT

Cities in Kansas
Cities in Neosho County, Kansas